The 1901 Kentucky State College Blue and White football team was an American football team that represented Kentucky State College (now known as the University of Kentucky) as a member of the Southern Intercollegiate Athletic Association (SIAA) during the 1901 college football season. In its second and final season under head coach  William H. Kiler, the team compiled an overall record of 2–6–1 record with a mark of 0–2 against SIAA opponents.

Schedule

References

Kentucky State College
Kentucky Wildcats football seasons
Kentucky State College Blue and White football